Damian Paletta is an American journalist who is currently the economics editor for The Washington Post. He was previously a White House correspondent for The Wall Street Journal.

Education 
Paletta received a B.A. from Boston College in 1999. He completed a M.S. in Journalism at the University of Missouri in 2002.

Career 
Paletta started at The Wall Street Journal as a reporter covering the fall-out from the 2008 financial crisis. In 2011, Paletta won the Scripps Howard Raymond Clapper Award and the Sigma Delta Chi award for Washington correspondence.

After the 2016 presidential election, Paletta was named a White House correspondent covering the new Trump administration for The Journal, until he joined The Post in 2017 again as a White House reporter but this time focusing on economic policy.

Paletta was appointed senior economics correspondent before being named economics editor in 2019. He has appeared on WNYC, C-SPAN and MSNBC.

Works

References

External links

Living people
Year of birth missing (living people)
Boston College alumni
Missouri School of Journalism alumni
The Washington Post people
American male journalists
Economics writers
21st-century journalists
The Wall Street Journal people